Will Knightley (born 23 April 1946) is an English television and stage actor.

He has primarily worked on the stage, and is a founding member of London's Half Moon Theatre. In addition to acting, he has performed voice-over work. He has had TV stints in The Bill, A Touch of Frost, Midsomer Murders and various adverts. In 2009 he appeared in the BBC drama A Short Stay in Switzerland.

In 2004, he appeared on the British series Rosemary & Thyme in the episode "Orpheus in the Undergrowth" as character Jeremy Pearson. He is the father of composer Caleb Knightley (b. 1979) and Two-Time Academy Award-nominated actress Keira Knightley (b. 1985).

Selected credits
EastEnders (2014) as Henry Summerhayes 
 A Short Stay in Switzerland (2009) as Dr Jack Turner
Calendar Girls (2009, stage play)
Flight Path (2007, stage play)
Cinderella (2005-6, stage pantomime) as Baron Hardup
Lone Star Mark Three (2005, stage play)
The Permanent Way (2005, stage play) as
The Brief (2004, TV series) as Gerry Graham
Rosemary & Thyme (2004, TV series) as Jeremy Pearson
Our God's Country (2002, stage play) as Captain Arthur Phillip
The School for Scandal (1996-7, stage play) as Sir Peter Teasle
Woman in Mind (1994, stage play) as Andy
Hush (1992, stage play) as Colin
Diplomatic Waves (1989, stage play) as John
Wild Honey (1984, stage play)
 The Hound of the Baskervilles (1982, television serial)
Epsom Downs (1977, stage play)
Afternoon Theatre: Only A Game (1976, radio play)

References

External links

1946 births
Alumni of the Royal Central School of Speech and Drama
English male radio actors
English male stage actors
English male voice actors
Living people
Male actors from London
20th-century English male actors
English male television actors
21st-century English male actors